Cavalcade of Dance is a 1943 American short film released by Warner Bros. Pictures and directed by Jean Negulesco. It was nominated for an Academy Award at the 16th Academy Awards for Best Short Subject (One-Reel).

Cast
 Veloz and Yolanda

References

External links
 

1943 films
1943 documentary films
1943 short films
Warner Bros. short films
American black-and-white films
Films directed by Jean Negulesco
1940s dance films
American short documentary films
1940s English-language films
1940s American films
1940s short documentary films